The Grêmio Recreativo Escola de Samba Acadêmicos do Grande Rio is a samba school of the Special Group of the carnival of the city of Rio de Janeiro, being headquartered on Almirante Barroso street in Duque de Caxias.

History 
In the 1950s, the city of Duque de Caxias had an effective participation in the Carioca Carnival, with the samba school Cartolinhas de Caxias. This school was placed among the elite of the schools 3 times (1951, 1958 e 1959), posteriorly placed, and frequently, among the intermediate schools and being well respected in the samba world. The last parade of Cartolinhas was in 1971, when with the goal to found a big school, that would worthily represent the municipality of the directors of Grande Rio and Acadêmicos de Caxias, these two schools unified and created in 1988, the Grêmio Recreativo Escola de Samba Acadêmicos do Grande Rio.

The school is very criticized for excessively taking famous people to the avenue and for its excellent results in the judging commission, because of the investments of the patron Jayder Soares and of Milton Perácio, that was the first president of the school.

Like mentioned above, Grande Rio has become specially notorious for bringing famous actresses as Queen of the Drums Sections, called "Rainhas de Bateria". Some of these celebrities below were included over the last years:

Carnavals of Grande Rio 
In its debut, in 1989, the school already rose to the next group, passing to the Grupo de Acesso A. In 1990, with the samba-enredo (plot) about the city of Rio de Janeiro, it won second and thus won promoted to the Special Group. When it starred among the big schools, the school did not go well:with the plot Antes, Durante e Depois: o despertar do homem ("Before, During, and After:the rouse of the man"), the school was placed in the 16th collocation, and returnmed to Grupo de Acesso A, despite to count on people such as the singer Dominguinhos do Estácio and the bateria director Mestre Paulão (consecrated in União da Ilha).

In 1992, the school reconquered the right to compete in the principal parade, being the champion of the Grupo de Acesso, with the plot Águas Claras para um Rei Negro ("Clear Waters for a Black King"). In its return to the Grupo Especial, with the plot No mundo da lua ("In the world of the moon"), of Alexandre Louzada, the school stimulated the Marquês de Sapucaí and was placed in the 9th collocation. In the following years, it did not have good results, but always maintained itself in the Special Group.

The arrival of Max Lopes to Grande Rio, in 1998, made the school obtain again good collocations. With a plot in honor to Luís Carlos Prestes, obtained the 8th collocation; in 1999, homaging Chatô, the school obtained its best collocation until then: 6th place. In 2000, with the Carnaval at sight, talked about the carnavals and the Brazilian parties celebrated for 500 years. A 9th place was not well received by the school, that would already leave an imprint in the Carioca Carnaval.

In 2001, the school brought again a good samba (this time with Quinho), and the star Joãosinho Trinta in command to tell the story of José Datrino. Once again, all complained about the school's 6th place, with no right to parade in the Parade of the Champions. In 2002, did not succeed to return to the Parade of the Champions, because it was placed in the 7th collocation. In 2003, with the plot O nosso Brasil que vale ("Our Brazil that is Worth"), the school of Duque de Caxias, finally succeeded to parade in the Parade of the Champions, with the third place celebrated like it was the title.

In the carnaval of 2004, the school had a bad accomplishment. Bringing a plot about the prevention of the AIDS, everything went bad: some floats were considered immodest and were censured and paraded covered, and even the parade itself was quite drowsy; the only exceptions were the good performance of the bateria and the tune of the community. Result: 10th place and the demmission of Joãosinho Trinta after the parade.

In 2005, the school did again a good parade, with the plot Alimentar o corpo e alma faz bem ("Feeding the body and the soul is good"). Counting on the sponsorship of Nestle, it brought well-built cars, a happy parade, great acting of the bateria, and conquest. Because of that the school was placed, like in 2003, in the third collocation. In the carnaval of 2006, telling the history of the exploration in the Amazon, the Grande Rio conquers its best result: the vice-championship, because it lost two tenths for exceeding the maximum time of parade in 1 minute (what took to the tie in number of points with the school Unidos de Vila Isabel, that won for having better notes in the requirements of tie breaking).

In 2007, the school homaged its city, Duque de Caxias, plot signed by the carnaval producer Roberto Szaniecki (that already signed the carnavals of 1996, 2005, and 2006 of the school). The school conquered its vice-championship for the second time.

For the carnaval of 2008, the school of Duque de Caxias brought to the Sambadrome the importance of the gas in our daily lives, homaging the city of Coari, in Amazonas, that possesses the petrochemical pole of Petrobrás, conquering a third place and finishing with the departure of Roberto Szaniecki after the results.

In 2010, the school took runner up honors in that year's Carnival edition. In the carnaval of 2018, In 2018, the school has hired the experienced carnival  Renato Lage and Márcia Lage that together signed the last fifteen carnivals in of the school-godmother, the Salgueiro. Where a problem in the last car of the school and holes in evolution, in which resulted in a loss of 0.5 tenths and the school's relegation to Serie A after 26 years, however the decision was overturned and the school remains as of today part of the Special Group.

The 2022 Carnival would prove to be Grande Rio's best finish yet, as it ended with the school's first general championship of the Special Group division.

Titles and prizes 

Grupo Especial (First division of Rio Carnival): 2022
Estandarte de Ouro (best plot - Grupo Especial): 2022
Grupo de Acesso A (second division): 1992
Estandarte de Ouro (best plot): 1994
Estandarte de Ouro (best samba/Grupo de Acesso): 1992
Best place in the Special Group: 2006 and 2007 (2 vice-championships)

Historic names of the school
Joãosinho Trinta
Nêgo
Jayder Soares
Leandrinho
Mestre Odilon
Milton Perácio
Emerson Dias
Susana Vieira
Paolla Oliveira

Classifications

References 

Article translated from Lusophone Wikipedia

External links 
 
 Profile of Grande Rio Samba School in English 

Samba schools of Rio de Janeiro
Duque de Caxias, Rio de Janeiro